Patrick Grace may refer to:

 Patrick H. Grace (1832–1896), United States Navy sailor and Medal of Honor recipient
 Patrick Grace (politician) (1900–1975), Australian politician